Choi Seong-woo (born June 25, 1954) is a South Korean voice actress who joined the voice acting division of Munhwa Broadcasting Corporation in 1976. Currently, Choi is cast in the Korea TV Edition of "CSI: Crime Scene Investigation" as Catherine Willows, replacing Marg Helgenberger.

Roles

Broadcast television
CSI: Crime Scene Investigation (replacing Marg Helgenberger, Korea TV Edition, MBC)

Movie dubbing
Charlie's Angels (replacing Kelly Lynch, Korea TV Edition, SBS)
Lethal Weapon 3 (replacing Rene Russo, Korea TV Edition, MBC)
Home Alone and Home Alone 2: Lost in New York (replacing Catherine O'Hara, Korea TV Edition, MBC)
Random Hearts (replacing Kristin Scott Thomas, Korea TV Edition, MBC)
In the Line of Fire (replacing Rene Russo, Korea TV Edition, MBC)
My Stepmother Is an Alien (replacing Kim Basinger, Korea TV Edition, MBC)
Postcards from the Edge (replacing Meryl Streep, Korea TV Edition, MBC)

Homepage
MBC Voice Acting Division Choi Seong-woo Blog 

Living people
South Korean voice actresses
1954 births